Barsukovskaya Cave is a karst cave in Maslyaninsky District of Novosibirsk Oblast. Its length is more than 100 meters. The depth of the cave is 19 meters.

Fauna
Barsukovskaya cave is the habitat of the largest wintering colony of bats in the southeast part of Western Siberia.

External links
A. L. Mugako. Natural Monuments: Ulantova Gora, Rocky Steppe near the village of Novososedovo, Barsukovskaya Cave, Berd Rocks.

Caves of Russia
Karst caves
Landforms of Novosibirsk Oblast
Natural monuments of Russia